Artamonov is a lunar impact crater on the far side of the Moon. Its eroded outer rim does not have the circular shape of most lunar craters, but the overall shape of three or four merged craters. The largest is in the south, with smaller circular bulges to the north and east.

The crater's interior floor has been resurfaced by subsequent flows of basaltic lava, leaving a relatively flat, featureless floor that appears darker due to lower albedo. It is faintly marked by lighter-hued ejecta from the crater Giordano Bruno to the north.

A linear formation of craters designated Catena Artamonov is alongside its northeast rim, following a course to the southeast. Nearby craters of note include Maxwell and Lomonosov to the northwest, and Edison to the west. To the east-northeast is the smaller crater Espin, while the small Malyy formation is to the south-southeast.

Artamov's name was approved by the IAU in 1970.

References

External links
 

Impact craters on the Moon